Waterlooville is a market town in the Borough of Havant in Hampshire, England, approximately  north northeast of Portsmouth. It is the largest town in the borough.

The town has a population of about 64,350 and is surrounded by Purbrook, Blendworth, Cowplain, Lovedean, Clanfield, Catherington, Crookhorn, Denmead, Hambledon, Horndean and Widley. It forms part of the South Hampshire conurbation. The town formed around the old A3 London to Portsmouth road.

Waterlooville is twinned with Maurepas, Yvelines in France and Henstedt-Ulzburg in Germany.

History 
It is reputed that the name derived from a pub that stood at the centre of the town, then known as Wait Lane End, where the stage-coach horses waited to change places with the team that pulled the coach up and over Portsdown Hill. The pub had been named Heroes of Waterloo because, on its opening day in 1815, soldiers who had just disembarked at Portsmouth, returning from the Battle of Waterloo, decided to stop there and celebrate their victory. According to local legend, many of them settled there.   The pub was thereafter renamed in their honour and the area around the pub became known as Waterloo. In order to differentiate the town from other places with the same name, it became known as Waterlooville at a later date. The town was known as Waterloo parish at the time of the 1911 Census.

The original "Heroes" pub was at a crossroads near the main bus-stop. It was demolished in 1966 and replaced with a bank; a new pub took the same name and is located at the northern end of the shopping precinct. There are two other pubs in the town centre: The Wellington closed in May 2017 and the site was redeveloped as a cocktail bar, called Number 73, which opened in March 2018. Other pubs are The Denmead Queen, part of the JD Wetherspoon pub chain.
In June 2015 Waterlooville town celebrated its first 200 years, its origins and history in a festival called Waterlooville 200.

The town centre was closed to traffic in 1985 when a bypass was constructed to take traffic away from the main shopping area. The bypass, initially anonymous, was named Maurepas Way sometime after the two towns were twinned in 1995. An underpass was constructed for pedestrians walking up along the Hambledon road. Between 1982 and 1983 the old road was then fully converted to a pedestrian precinct. The precinct had a fountain and raised area at the northern end, near the Heroes pub; however, regular vandalism of the fountain soon resulted in its removal.

GEC Marconi built a site at Waterlooville for their Underwater Systems Division in the early 1980s, for the Stingray anti-submarine torpedo. A peace camp was set up near the construction site. After completion of the GEC building, a free music festival was held at Old Park Farm in Waterlooville called Torpedo Town. A second Torpedo Town festival was held in August 1987 at Bramdean Common near Winchester.

Near the town centre is St George's Church, rebuilt in 1968–70 around the core of the original (1830) church.  Waterlooville Baptist Church was built in 1967 in a Modernist style to replace the original chapel of 1884–85 in the town centre.  During the 1950s and 1960s the surrounding area saw extensive growth in housing, when large suburban public and private housing estates were constructed. This resulted in the original Victorian church failing to cope with the population growth. Plans for a new church were started and in 1970 the new church was built on the site of the old church. Parts of the old church were retained.

In July 2011 the town saw the consecration of its first Roman Catholic Church. For the preceding eighty years the growing Catholic community in the town had utilised at first one aisle of, and ultimately the entire of the chapel at St Michaels convent. However, the decision of the sisters of Our Lady of Charity to sell the main convent site coupled with the inadequate capacity led to a new church being required. The new church which is dedicated to "The Sacred Heart of Jesus and St Peter the Apostle" sits to the north of the town centre on London Road.

In August 2012 the northern part of the shopping centre underwent a £700,000 renovation, the raised area holding the former fountain was removed and new block paving installed. The renovation increased the area available to the weekly Friday market and improved pedestrian accessibility. In addition a "smoking-shelter" style band-stand was installed at pedestrian T-junction with The Boulevard.

Climate 
Waterlooville has a temperate oceanic climate (Köppen climate classification Cfb), similar to much of southern Britain. However, the climate in the area does have mild differences between highs and lows. with Chilly winters and warm summers. Although  is common in July and August, the area rarely achieves above . During winter, Waterlooville tends to have more frost than nearby Portsmouth as it has less influences from the sea and is more exposed to northerly winds. However, highs in the summer are slightly warmer than Portsmouth because there is less influence of cool breezes from the English Channel as the town is more inland. Sunshine averages are typical of that across the Portsmouth area, Isle of Wight and the south-west Sussex coast of around 1800 – 2100 hours of sunshine a year, where Southwesterly winds keep the sunshine hours up between late March and mid September, the town is also protected by the South Downs.

Transport 
The main shopping precinct is served by First Hampshire & Dorset bus routes 7, 8, The X9 route has been discontinued and replaced by the D1 and D2 service which runs from Hambledon and Denmead and goes to Waterlooville town centre, and Stagecoach South services 37 and 39. The A3 Bus Corridor priority route (constructed between 2003 and 2007) serves the town. , the shopping precinct is closed to all road traffic other than buses.

The nearest train station is located in Bedhampton and is on the main train route between London and Portsmouth. For a time, South West Trains provided a direct bus link to Petersfield railway station via Horndean, enabling quick access to fast London-bound trains, but now the link to Petersfield is Stagecoach service 37 via Clanfield.  Havant railway station is served by Stagecoach service 39, and stations in Portsmouth by First services 7 and 8. For westbound trains the station at Cosham, served by the local bus services, is on the line between Portsmouth and Fareham, with regular trains to Southampton and Cardiff.

Sport
Waterlooville has a swimming pool which is used by Havant and Waterlooville Swimming Club.

Waterlooville Cricket Club plays its home games at Jubilee Park. It runs three Saturday sides and has a youth set-up. The 1st XI currently competes in the Southern Premier Cricket League Division 2 with other sides spread across the Hampshire League spectrum.

There is a bowls club with a carpet green in Jubilee Park.

Havant & Waterlooville football club, which plays in Havant, was formed in 1998 after a merger between Havant Town and Waterlooville.

Governance 
The area is unparished, therefore Waterlooville does not have a parish council or town council. The first tier of local government is the Borough of Havant, with councillors elected for its Waterloo, Hart Plain, Cowplain, and Stakes wards. The upper tier is Hampshire County Council; the town centre is combined with Stakes North as the single-councillor division of Waterlooville and Stakes North, while another division covers Cowplain and Hart Plain.

For representation to the House of Commons, Waterlooville falls within the Meon Valley constituency, and the Havant constituency is nearby to the south and east.

Development 

Much of Waterlooville as well as Purbrook, Cowplain and Horndean, has spread out from London Road. However, to the west of Waterlooville and Purbrook, the area bordered by Hambledon Road and London Road contains undeveloped land. As a result, the centre of Waterlooville borders fields to the west just a few hundred meters away, while to the north, east and south it is bordered by housing estates and Cowplain and Purbrook respectively.

In 2009, years of planning and joint involvement of Havant and Winchester councils came to fruition with the 'West of Waterlooville Major Development Area' housing scheme, starting with Maurepas Roundabout being enlarged to accommodate a new road and increased traffic. The work was delayed for some time, but continued in January 2012.

An idea has been proposed to redevelop Wellington Way into 264 rental flats as well as some commercial units in an attempt to increase rekindle interest into the local area. Wellington Way has been largely left behind with many of the shops standing empty and have been for some time. Wellington Way is owned by Westbrook Properties, the same company that have proposed the plan. They are offering to build a 9-story purpose build private rented accommodation block with a ground floor gym and shared courtyard balcony for residents.

Education 

Waterlooville contains ten primary schools: Morelands Primary School, Meadowlands Junior and Infants School,
Padnell Infants and Junior School, Hart Plain Infants and Junior schools, Springwood Infant School (formerly Stakes Hill Infant School), Springwood Junior School (formerly Hulbert Junior School), Mill Hill Primary School (formerly Waite End Infants and Waite End Junior School and Waite End Primary School), Purbrook Infant and Junior Schools, Queens Inclosure Primary and St. Peter's Catholic Primary.

Two new two form entry primary schools are to be built in the new housing development area situated off the Maurepas Roundabout. The first of these is scheduled to open in September 2014 with a possible Year R only intake depending on the number of children needing places.

It contains five secondary schools: Horndean Technology College, The Cowplain School, Oaklands Catholic School, Purbrook Park School and Crookhorn College.

There are two colleges, Oaklands Catholic Sixth Form College and South Downs College.

Notable residents
 Christopher Hitchens, writer, born in Waterlooville
 Lewis Ganson, one of the most prolific writers in magic
 Michael Giles, drummer, King Crimson, born in Waterlooville
 James Edward Ignatius Masterson VC – won the Victoria Cross in 1900, retired to, and died in Waterlooville
 General Sir Charles James Napier – retired to, and died in Waterlooville; his former house is now part of Oaklands School
 Beatrice Shilling, aeronautical engineer, born in Waterlooville
 Rob Styles, retired FIFA and FA Premier League Referee
 Simon Whitlock, darts player, born Cessnock, Australia

See also
List of places of worship in the Borough of Havant

References

External links 

Waterlooville celebrates its first 200 years  (2015)

Towns in Hampshire